The Hungarian records in swimming are the fastest ever performances of swimmers from Hungary, which are recognised and ratified by the Magyar Úszó Szövetség (MÚSZ).

Long Course (50 m)

Men

Women

Mixed relay

Short Course (25 m)

Men

Women

Mixed relay

References

External links
 MÚSZ web site
 Hungarian Records

Hungary
Records
Swimming
Swimming